Bethany is an unincorporated community in Harrison Township, Bartholomew County, in the U.S. state of Indiana.

History
An old variant name of the community was called South Bethany. A post office was established under this name in 1861, and remained in operation until it was discontinued in 1903.

Geography

Demographics

Bethany appeared as a separately-returned community in only one U.S. Census. In 1870, the census reported that the town had a population of 54 residents.

References

Unincorporated communities in Bartholomew County, Indiana
Unincorporated communities in Indiana